Paterson GlobalFoods (PGF) is a family-owned international agri-food business. It was established in 1908 as the N. M. Paterson Company.

In 1912, N. M. Paterson built its first elevator at Fort William, with a handling capacity of 75,000 bushels. By 1928 the company, through construction and acquisition, owned 107 line elevators, and had entered the shipping business with the 1926 purchase of eleven steamers from the Interlake Steamship Company of Cleveland.

Today, PatersonGlobalFoods operates several divisions in the food industry.

It is headquartered at 333 Main St. in Winnipeg, Manitoba, Canada.

Related Companies
 Paterson Grain

References

External links
Paterson GlobalFoods
Paterson Grain
 Alliance Grain Terminal

Companies based in Winnipeg